Uttarayanam is a 1975 Malayalam-language film directed by G. Aravindan and written by Thikkodiyan. Aravindan debuted with this film. The film, which exposes opportunism and hypocrisy set against the backdrop of the Independence struggle, is inspired by Aravindan's own cartoon series, titled Cheriya Lokavum Valiya Manushyarum (Small World and Big People), which was published in Mathrubhumi for several years.

The film is about Ravi, an unemployed young man, who has to face a series of encounters during his search for a job. Ravi reflects on the past struggles of the anti-British freedom fighters he has learned about from his paralyzed father. He eventually meets Gopalan Muthalaly, a leader of Quit India movement, but now a corrupt contractor. Mohandas plays the protagonist and Kunju, Balan K. Nair, Adoor Bhasi, Kunjandi and Sukumaran play other roles. The film garnered wide critical praise and several awards, including five Kerala State Film Awards, upon release. It was a prophetic film that foresaw the dark era of national emergency that was to follow immediately. From Utharayanam’s idealist and political conflicts, Aravindan moved to the eternal dilemma relating to power and justice. An experimental film, it has influenced the parallel cinema movement in Kerala to a great extent.

Plot
Ravi is an unemployed MA graduate who writes exams and attends interviews but fails to land a job. He lives with his mother and grandmother. His grandfather, Madhavan Menon was a Gandhian who believed in non-cooperation movement and held non-violent protests against the British. Madhavan Menon married off his daughter to Govindan who turns out to be a revolutionary who believed in Bhagat Singh and armed revolution as the only solution to oust the British Empire. Menon's brother-in-law is Adhikaari who helps the police officers to capture both Congress supporters and revolutionary rebels. Inside the revolutionary movement itself are the soft-heartened like Gopalan who betray the movements on being questioned by the police. Ravi spends time with Kumaran Master, who was a fellow revolutionary with his father. Master spends his time making masks. Both of them visit Achuthan who was another revolutionary but is now frail and bedridden. Master provides Ravi with a letter to meet Gopalan, who Ravi finds is now a rich businessman who drinks liquor with political leaders of minority communities and talk about the freedom struggle days. Ravi meets David, a college-mate of his who hated politics back then, but is now a Trade Union activist who helps Gopalan muthalali with construction of star hotel. Ravi meets Premkumar, another college-mate who is a medical representative and spends his leisure time on drinks, smoke and women. For some days, Ravi stays with Premkumar and his room-mate former Mr. Kerala and bodybuilder Balan who advises them about health being wealth. Ravi is not able to reciprocate the love shown to him by Radha. In the end, a disillusioned Ravi goes to the mountains and seeks a godman who reads to him from the Upanishads about not lusting after another person's possessions. Ravi finally arrives in the presence of a tribal woman burning leaves and throws his mask into it.

Cast 
 
Dr. Mohandas as Ravi
Kunjandi as Kumaran Master, a former revolutionary
Adoor Bhasi as Adhikari
Sukumaran as Premkumar, Medical Representative
Vijayan as David, Trade Union leader
Balan K. Nair as Achuthan, a revolutionary
Mallika Sukumaran as Radha
Premji as Madhavan Menon, Ravi's grandfather, a staunch Congress supporter
Radhamani as mother
Santha Devi as grandmother
T. G. Ravi as Govindan, Ravi's father, a revolutionary

Soundtrack 
The music was composed by K. Raghavan.

Awards
 Kerala State Film Awards
 Best Film - Pattathuvila Karunakaran (producer), G. Aravindan (director)
 Best Director - G. Aravindan
 Best Screenplay - Thikkodiyan, G. Aravindan
 Best Photography (Black and white) - Mankada Ravi Varma
 Second Best Actor - Balan K. Nair
 Best Art Director - Artist Namboothiri

 National Film Awards
 Award for the Best Feature Film on the 25th anniversary of India's Independence
 National Film Award for Best Feature Film in Malayalam

References

External links
 

1970s Malayalam-language films
1975 directorial debut films
1975 films
Films directed by G. Aravindan
Best Malayalam Feature Film National Film Award winners